Crooked Creek Township is one of eight townships in Bollinger County, Missouri, USA. As of the 2000 U.S. Census, its population was 1,182. As of the 2010 U.S. Census, the population had increased to 1,234.

Crooked Creek Township was established in 1872, and named after a creek of the same name noted for its irregular course.

Demographics
As of the 2010 U.S. Census, there were 1,234 people living in the township. There were 631 housing units in the township. The racial makeup of the township was 97.49% White, 0.24% Black or African American, 1.70% Native American, 0.08% Asian, and 0.49% from two or more races. Approximately 0.49% of the population were Hispanic or Latino of any race.

Geography

Incorporated Areas
The township contains no incorporated settlements.

Unincorporated Areas
The township contains the unincorporated areas and historical communities of Bessville, Grisham, Lodge, Shrum, and Tallent.

Cemeteries
The township contains the following nine cemeteries: Berry, Dalton, Hawn, Lincoln, McMahan, Moores, Old Concord, Slinkard, and Wallis.

Streams
The streams of Alex Branch, Big Blue Branch, Denton Creek, Hawn Creek, Henson Branch, Huffmans Creek, Indian Creek, Punch Creek, Reagan Branch, Shrum Branch, Stones Branch, Summers Creek, Turkey Creek and Turkey Creek flow through Crooked Creek Township.

Landmarks
Amidon Memorial Conservation Area 
Hawn Access

Administrative Districts

School Districts
Meadow Heights R-II School District 
Woodland R-IV School District

Political Districts
Missouri's 8th Congressional District 
State House District 145 
State Senate District 27

References

 USGS Geographic Names Information System (GNIS)

External links
 US-Counties.com
 City-Data.com

Townships in Bollinger County, Missouri
Cape Girardeau–Jackson metropolitan area
Townships in Missouri